The 2006 PlaceMakers V8 International was a motor race for V8 Supercars held on the weekend of 21–23 April 2006. The event was held at the Pukekohe Park Raceway in Pukekohe, New Zealand, and consisted of three races culminating in 400 kilometers. It was the second round of thirteen in the 2006 V8 Supercar Championship Series and the first of two international events on the calendar.

Results

Qualifying

Top Ten Shootout

Race 1

Race 2

Race 3

References

Pukekohe
Motorsport in New Zealand
2006 in New Zealand motorsport